Harold Readett (15 October 1910 – 1990) was an English professional footballer who played as a full back during the 1930s. Although he was on the books of three different Football League clubs, he played just four matches in the Football League.

References

1910 births
1990 deaths
People from Darwen
English footballers
Association football defenders
Blackburn Rovers F.C. players
Manchester Central F.C. players
Leigh Genesis F.C. players
Ashton United F.C. players
Burnley F.C. players
Wrexham A.F.C. players
Rossendale United F.C. players
English Football League players